Le Volant d'Or de Toulouse is an international badminton open tournament held annually in France since 1996. It was halted in 2001 and 2005, and with a prize money of 15.000 US Dollar it belonged to the BE-Circuit. It was last held in 2009.

Previous winners

External links
 Official website
 2008

Badminton tournaments in France
1996 establishments in France
Recurring sporting events established in 1996
2009 disestablishments in France
Recurring sporting events disestablished in 2009